The Antigua and Barbuda national rugby union team represents Antigua and Barbuda in the sport of rugby union. They have thus far not qualified for a Rugby World Cup, and have not participated in qualifying tournaments.

Antigua and Barbuda compete  in the Caribbean Championship, a tournament which includes Trinidad and Tobago, Bermuda, the Cayman Islands, Jamaica, the Bahamas, British Virgin Islands, and Guyana.

See also
 Rugby union in Antigua and Barbuda

References

Caribbean national rugby union teams
Rugby union
Rugby union in Antigua and Barbuda